Thomas Holt (died between 1408 and 1417) was an English politician and lawyer.

Family
Holt married, before January 1408, a woman named Joan. Holt was from Canterbury, Kent.

Career
Holt was a Member of Parliament for Canterbury constituency, in 1386. He was a landowner in the Westgate area of Canterbury, on the Isle of Thanet and in the area between Canterbury and Sandwich.

References

Year of birth missing
Year of death missing
14th-century births
15th-century deaths
English MPs 1386
People from Canterbury